Morné Ferreira (born 2 February 1994) is a rugby union referee, currently on the South African Rugby Union's National Panel.

Career

Ferreira is a member of the  Rugby Union Referee's society. In 2019, he refereed at the Craven Week, the premier rugby tournament for schools in South Africa, and also took charge of the u18 International match between France and Wales. He was also selected to referee at the 2019 Africa Men's Sevens Olympic Qualifying tournament.

In 2020, he made his Varsity Cup debut and took charge of three matches in the u21 Provincial Championship. He officiated in a number of matches in the 2021 Varsity Cup, culminating in him taking charge of the Varsity Cup final between the University of Cape Town and the University of Pretoria.

2022 started off well for Ferreira as he again refereed a number of Varsity Cup matches while he continued to make his mark in South Africa's premier rugby competition by refereeing 6 matches during the round-robin stage of the Currie Cup.

International
In 2021, Ferreira was named on the World Rugby Sevens Series Panel, making his debut at the HSBC Emirates Dubai 7's tournament in November of that year. 
He also made his 15's international debut at the Stellenbosch Challenge in November 2021 refereeing two matches; Namibia vs Kenya and Kenya vs Brazil.
2022 turned out to be a big year for Ferreira at high-performance 7's level as he was confirmed as one of 8 men's referees to referee at the Commonwealth Games in Birmingham. He was also announced on the squad of 10 men's referees to hold the whistle for the Rugby World Cup Sevens in Cape Town . In 2023, Ferreira will be making his debut in the Six Nations Under 20s Championship when he takes charge of the match between Scotland and Italy on the 19th of March.

Personal life
Ferreira has a Master's degree in Neuro and Exercise Physiology obtained from the University of Pretoria. He is the younger brother of JP Ferreira, who is currently the defence coach at Bath Rugby in England.

External links
SA Rugby Referees Profile

References

Living people
1994 births
South African rugby union referees
SARU referees
Currie Cup referees